José Cristóbal Aguilar (1816 – April 11, 1886) was a Californio politician and journalist, who served three terms as Mayor of Los Angeles, the last Hispanic to hold the office until 2005, with the election of Antonio Villaraigosa.

Background
Aguilar, also known as Cristoval, was born in California in 1816 to Jose María Aguilar and María Ygnacia Elizalde.

The Aguilars lived in an adobe facing the Los Angeles Plaza on what is now North Main Street. This house was a prominent landmark that later served as the town calabozo, or jail, and then as the town's first hospital, in 1858.

On October 31, 1848, Aguilar married Maria Dolores Yorba at the San Gabriel Mission. His wife was the daughter of José Antonio de los Remidios Yorba and María Catalina Verdugo. The Yorbas possessed vast land holdings including most of the Santa Ana Valley (in present-day Orange County, California).

In the 1870 census, the Aguilars had four children living with them: Librada, 19; Jose M., 17; Matias, 12; Guadalupe, 10, and Rosa, 7.

Aguilar could not speak English, but, as reported by Los Angeles historian H.D. Barrows in 1899, he "made a good and acceptable Mayor because of the general familiarity of citizens of all nationalities then residing here, with the Spanish tongue."

Political life

Aguilar "held prominent office under Mexican rule."
After the transfer of California from Mexico to the United States, the Mexican ayuntamiento was abolished in favour of a city council system. A Democrat, Aguilar was elected to the new Los Angeles Common Council  on July 1, 1850, and he served in 1850-51, 1855–56, 1858–59 and 1861-62. He was mayor of Los Angeles in 1866-67, 1867–68 and 1870-72.

Aguilar was elected to the Board of Supervisors three times, serving in 1854-56, 1860 and 1862-64.

Aguilar was first elected mayor on May 7, 1866. The election was certified three days later and he assumed office that same day. In that same year he signed an ordinance to set aside five acres of land as a "Public Square or Plaza, for the use and benefit of the Citizens in common," which land later was named Pershing Square.

Aguilar was unseated for three months in the middle of his first term and replaced by Damien Marchesseault. During that time he served as Zanjero of Los Angeles (water steward). With Los Angeles being in a Mediterranean climate and risks of both drought and flooding a constant threat, this position was actually considered more important than the mayor and paid the highest salary of any city official at the time. On August 8, 1867, Aguilar was reinstated as mayor and served the remainder of his term. His decision in 1868 to retain control over the city's water rights and reserves is considered one of the most important in Los Angeles' history.

In 1868, Aguilar lost re-election to Joel Turner and was subsequently appointed as zanjero once again.

Aguilar was elected mayor in 1870 over Andrew Glassell by a vote of 436 to 428, and he was installed despite a requested recount. He was defeated for reelection in 1872 by J.R. Toberman in a vote of 715 for Toberman and 350 for Aguilar. During that election, Toberman "made an issue" of Aguilar's "poor English."

Historian John P. Schmal noted that:

When Aguilar became Mayor, there were less than 6,000 residents in the City.  When the city council proposed selling off the city's water rights to bring in additional revenue, Aguilar vetoed the proposal. If Aguilar had not used his power of veto, Los Angeles would have lost control of its water rights, leading to serious problems at a later date.

In December 1873, Aguilar was again appointed as zanjero by a vote in the Common Council of 7-2 over T.H. Eaton. Aguilar served until December 5, 1878.

Later years
After retiring from politics Aguilar wrote for La Cronica, the City's leading Spanish-language newspaper at the time. In the paper, he wrote a regular column on local community issues.

He died of a heart attack on April 11, 1886, at the age of 70.

The Los Angeles Herald wrote of him in an obituary:

He was at one time a wealthy man and brought up a large family with much care, giving each a good education. Later he lost most of his property, as many others did, in the dark days of the municipality before there was a market for products of the soil. . . . He was getting on his horse to ride out and see to a water ditch, and fell back dead.

The funeral was at the Church of Our Lady the Queen of Angels

References
Chronological Record of Los Angeles City Officials: 1850—1938, Compiled under Direction of Municipal Reference Library City Hall, Los Angeles March 1938 (Reprinted 1966)

External links
Estrada, William. "The Last Latino Mayor of Los Angeles: Jose Cristobal Aguilar, 1866-1868, 1871-1872," Center For Law In the Public Interest, June 30, 2005

Mayors of Los Angeles
Los Angeles Common Council (1850–1889) members
Los Angeles County Board of Supervisors
1816 births
1886 deaths
People of Mexican California
Hispanic and Latino American mayors in California
19th-century American politicians
Greater Los Angeles Democratic Party politicians